Nenciuleşti may refer to several villages in Romania:

 Nenciuleşti, a commune in Teleorman County
 Nenciuleşti, a village in Merei Commune, Buzău County
 Nenciuleşti, a village in Tetoiu Commune, Vâlcea County